Eleftherios "Lefteris" Mantzoukas (alternate spelling: Madzoukas) (born July 8, 2003) is a Greek professional basketball player for Panathinaikos of the Greek Basket League and the EuroLeague. He is a 2.07 m (6'9 ") tall power forward.

Professional career
On 14 February 2018, at the age of 14, Mantzoukas began his pro career with Promitheas Patras, in the Greek Basket League, during the 2017–18 season. He made his Greek League debut in a game versus Panionios, in which he scored 2 points, in 1 minute of playing time. Mantzoukas thus became the second youngest player to ever debut in the top-tier level Greek League, since it became fully professional in 1992. Georgios Papagiannis is the only other player to have previously debuted in the same competition, at a younger age. 

Three months later, on 24 May 2017, while still at the age of 13, Mantzoukas became the youngest player to ever start a game in the top-tier level Greek League, since it became fully professional in 1992. He accomplished that when he started a Greek League game against Olympiacos, in which he scored 12 points, in 31 minutes of playing time. During the 2017–18 Greek League season, he averaged 2.9 points, 1.3 rebounds, and 0.6 assists per game, in 7 games played.

On 10 October 2018, at the age of 15, Mantzoukas debuted in one of the two European-wide secondary level competitions, the FIBA Champions League, during the 2018–19 season. He made his FIBA Champions League debut in a game versus the Belgian League club Oostende, in which he went scoreless, in 1 minute of playing time. During the 2018–19 FIBA Champions League season, he averaged 3.5 points and 0.5 rebounds per game, in 2 games played. He also averaged 1.5 points, 1.0 rebounds, and 0.8 assists per game, in 4 games played, during the 2018–19 Greek League season.

On 2 October 2019, at the age of 16, Mantzoukas debuted in the other European-wide secondary level competition, the EuroCup, during the 2019–20 season. He made his EuroCup debut in a game versus the Israeli Super League club Maccabi Rishon LeZion, in which he scored 2 points.

On 18 December 2020, Promitheas announced that Mantzoukas would be moving to EuroLeague mainstay Panathinaikos on a five-year contract.

National team career
Mantzoukas has been a member of the junior national teams of Greece. He played at the 2018 FIBA Under-16 European Championship, where he averaged 9.3 points, 4.8 rebounds, and 1.4 assists per game. He also played at the 2019 FIBA Under-16 European Championship, where he averaged 15.0 points, 9.1 rebounds, and 2.7 assists per game.

References

External links
EuroCup Profile
Eurobasket.com Profile
Greek Basket League Profile 
Greek Basket League Profile 

2003 births
Living people
Greek men's basketball players
Panathinaikos B.C. players
Power forwards (basketball)
Promitheas Patras B.C. players
Sportspeople from Ioannina